The Army Sergeant Major is the most senior member of the other ranks of the British Army. The three appointment holders have actually been commissioned officers (and former warrant officers class 1) holding the rank of captain, although uniform and insignia similar to that of a warrant officer class 1 is worn while holding the appointment. The appointment was created as part of the changes to the British Army's top ranks around February 2015. The ASM sits on the Executive Committee of the Army Board (ECAB) and works with the Secretary of State for Defence, top civil servants and other high-ranking members to shape British Army policy. The first appointment was made in March 2015.

The Army Sergeant Major's rank badge is the royal coat of arms within a wreath.

Appointees

See also
Warrant Officer of the Royal Air Force – Royal Air Force equivalent
Corps Regimental Sergeant Major – Royal Marines equivalent 
Warrant Officer of the Naval Service – Royal Navy equivalent

References

Senior appointments of the British Army
Warrant officers